Pedro Cachín won the title, beating top seed Pablo Carreño 7–5, 6–3

Seeds

Draw

Finals

Top half

Bottom half

References
 Main Draw
 Qualifying Draw

Copa Sevilla singles
Copa Sevilla - Singles